Bishehi (also Romanized as Bīsheh’ī; also known as Bīsheh) is a village in Olya Tayeb Rural District, in the Central District of Landeh County, Kohgiluyeh and Boyer-Ahmad Province, Iran. At the 2006 census, its population was 111, in 20 families.

References 

Populated places in Landeh County